Alessandro Guardassoni (13 December 1819 in Bologna – 1 March 1888 in Bologna) was an Italian painter.  He mainly painted religious themes. He trained in the Accademia Pontificia di Belle Arti of Bologna, under Clemente Albèri. He collaborated with Cesare Mauro Trebbi. He painted some of the frescoes in the church of San Giuliano, Bologna. He was named to a professorship of the Accademia Felsinea.

Sources
 Information from entry in Italian Wikipedia
Discorsi letti nella grand' aula della Pontificia accademia di belle arti in Bologna, (1841).

 

19th-century Italian painters
Italian male painters
Painters from Bologna
1819 births
1888 deaths
Accademia di Belle Arti di Bologna alumni
19th-century Italian male artists